Events from the year 1839 in China.

Incumbents 
 Daoguang Emperor (19th year)

Viceroys
 Viceroy of Zhili —  
 Viceroy of Min-Zhe — 
 Viceroy of Huguang — 
 Viceroy of Shaan-Gan — ?
 Viceroy of Liangguang —  
 Viceroy of Yun-Gui — 
 Viceroy of Sichuan — 
 Viceroy of Liangjiang —

Events 
 Daoguang Emperor appointed scholar-official Lin Zexu to the post of Special Imperial Commissioner with the task of eradicating the opium trade. He bans the trade of opium and writes a letter to Queen Victoria asking her to stop the illegal importation of opium
 early July 1839 - a group of British merchant sailors in Kowloon became intoxicated after consuming rice liqueur. Two of the sailors became agitated with and beat to death Lin Weixi, a villager from nearby Tsim Sha Tsui. They are disciplined by British military court and the British refuse to hand them over to Chinese prosecutors

Ongoing
 Opium War

References

 
China